UAE Team ADQ is a professional cycling team based in Italy, which competes in elite road bicycle racing events such as the UCI Women's World Tour. In the 2022 season, it had a roster of 15 riders representing eight different nationalities.

Team history
In September 2019, the team announced they had brought onboard Slovenian co-title sponsor, BTC Ljubljana, for the 2020 season; enabling the squad to apply for top-tier UCI Women's WorldTour status through to the end of the 2023 season.

In October 2021,  confirmed it would take over and rebrand the team, joining a growing list of men's teams that have a top-level women's team. In mid-December 2021, the team kit for the 2022 season was revealed, along with the new team name, UAE Team ADQ, with the team bringing on sovereign wealth fund ADQ as an additional sponsor.

Doping
On 21 November 2015, it emerged that Uênia Fernandes de Souza had returned a positive drugs test for EPO and was subsequently suspended for 30 days.

Team roster

Major wins

2011
Stage 3 Ladies Tour of Qatar, Monia Baccaille
Stage 5 Giro d'Italia Femminile, Nicole Cooke
Gp Cento Carnevale D'europa, Monia Baccaille
2012
Grand Prix de Dottignies, Monia Baccaille
Stage 2 Tour of Chongming Island, Monia Baccaille
 Overall Trophée d'Or Féminin, Elena Cecchini
Stage 1, Elena Cecchini
Stage 3, Susanna Zorzi
 Overall Giro Toscana Femminile, Małgorzata Jasińska
Stage 2, Małgorzata Jasińska
2013
Stage 5 Energiewacht Tour, Valentina Carretta
Mountains classification Festival Luxembourgeois du cyclisme féminin, Valentina Scandolara
 Italian rider classification Giro Rosa, Tatiana Guderzo
Stage 2 Tour Féminin en Limousin, Tatiana Antoshina
Stage 6 Thüringen Rundfahrt der Frauen, Valentina Scandolara
Stage 7 Thüringen Rundfahrt der Frauen, Tatiana Guderzo
Stage 6 Holland Ladies Tour, Tatiana Guderzo
2014
 Sprints classification Vuelta Internacional Femenina a Costa Rica, Shelley Olds
Stages 3 & 5, Shelley Olds
GP Comune di Cornaredo, Shelley Olds
 Sprints classification Energiewacht Tour, Marta Tagliaferro
Winston-Salem Cycling Classic, Shelley Olds
Stage 2 La Route de France, Barbara Guarischi
 Points classification Trophée d'Or Féminin, Barbara Guarischi
Teams classification
Stage 3, Barbara Guarischi
 Overall Giro della Toscana Int. Femminile, Shelley Olds
 Points classification, Shelley Olds
 Mountains classification, Małgorzata Jasińska
Prologue & Stage 1, Shelley Olds
Stage 2, Małgorzata Jasińska
2015
 Youth classification Ladies Tour of Qatar, Beatrice Bartelloni
Stage 1, Annalisa Cucinotta
2016
Gran Prix San Luis Femenino, Małgorzata Jasińska
Teams classification Tour Femenino de San Luis
Stage 2, Marta Tagliaferro
Omloop van het Hageland, Marta Bastianelli
GP della Liberazione, Marta Bastianelli
Stage 5 Gracia–Orlová, Marta Tagliaferro
2017
 Points classification Santos Women's Tour, Chloe Hosking
 Mountains classification, Janneke Ensing
Stage 3, Chloe Hosking
Drentse Acht van Westerveld, Chloe Hosking
GP della Liberazione, Marta Bastianelli
Stage 1 Emakumeen Euskal Bira, Marta Bastianelli
Stage 3 The Women's Tour, Chloe Hosking
Stage 9 Giro d'Italia Femminile, Marta Bastianelli
 Sprints classification Ladies Tour of Norway, Daiva Tušlaitė
 Mountains classification, Janneke Ensing
Stage 2, Chloe Hosking
Stage 6 Holland Ladies Tour, Janneke Ensing
2018
Stage 4 Women's Tour Down Under, Chloe Hosking
Cadel Evans Great Ocean Road Race, Chloe Hosking
 Points classification Women's Herald Sun Tour, Chloe Hosking
Stage 2 Setmana Ciclista Valenciana, Marta Bastianelli
Le Samyn des Dames, Janneke Ensing
Gold Trophy in Euro-Women's Bike Race, Marta Bastianelli
Gent–Wevelgem, Marta Bastianelli
Grand Prix de Dottignies, Marta Bastianelli
Brabantse Pijl Dames Gooik, Marta Bastianelli
Commonwealth Games Road Race, Chloe Hosking
Trofee Maarten Wynants, Marta Bastianelli
 Basque rider classification Emakumeen Euskal Bira, Ane Santesteban
Stage 3 BeNe Ladies Tour, Marta Bastianelli
 Overall Giro della Toscana Int. Femminile – Memorial Michela Fanini, Soraya Paladin
Stage 1, Marta Bastianelli
Stage 2, Soraya Paladin
2019
 Mountains classification Women's Tour Down Under, Nadia Quagliotto
1st Stage 4, Chloe Hosking
 Points classification Women's Herald Sun Tour, Chloe Hosking
 Points classification Vuelta a Burgos Feminas, Soraya Paladin
Stage 1, Karlijn Swinkels
Stages 2 & 3, Soraya Paladin
 German rider classification Thüringen Rundfahrt der Frauen, Romy Kasper
Stage 2a BeNe Ladies Tour, Jelena Erić
 Mountains classification Giro della Toscana Int. Femminile – Memorial Michela Fanini, Soraya Paladin
Stage 1, Chloe Hosking
Stage 2, Soraya Paladin
 Overall Giro delle Marche in Rosa, Soraya Paladin
 Mountains classification, Soraya Paladin
Stage 3, Soraya Paladin
Tour of Guangxi Women's WorldTour, Chloe Hosking
2020
Vuelta a la Comunitat Valenciana Feminas, Marta Bastianelli
2021
Stage 2 Vuelta a Burgos Feminas, Anastasia Chursina
Stage 2 Tour de Suisse, Marta Bastianelli
La Périgord Ladies, Marta Bastianelli
Stage 2 (ITT) Holland Ladies Tour, Marlen Reusser
Stage 1 Challenge by La Vuelta, Marlen Reusser
Stage 5 Tour Cycliste Féminin International de l'Ardèche, Marta Bastianelli
Giro dell'Emilia Internazionale Donne Elite, Marta Bastianelli
Stage 1 The Women's Tour, Marta Bastianelli
Chrono des Nations, Marlen Reusser
2022
Vuelta a la Comunitat Valenciana Feminas, Marta Bastianelli
 Mountains classification Setmana Ciclista Valenciana
Stage 4, Marta Bastianelli
Omloop van het Hageland, Marta Bastianelli
Trofeo Oro in Euro–Women’s Bike Race, Sofia Bertizzolo
Omloop van Borsele, Maaike Boogaard
 Overall Grand Prix Elsy Jacobs, Marta Bastianelli
 Points classification, Marta Bastianelli
Team classification
Stage 1, Marta Bastianelli
 Points classification Bretagne Ladies Tour, Marta Bastianelli
Stage 1 & 2, Marta Bastianelli
Stage 3, Alena Ivanchenko
Stage 3 Vuelta a Burgos Feminas, Margarita Victoria García

National and continental champions

2011
 Italy Track (Team Sprint), Elisa Frisoni
 Italy Track (Scratch race), Tatiana Guderzo
 Italy Track (500m TT), Elisa Frisoni
 Italy Track (Sprint), Elisa Frisoni
2012
 Italy Time Trial, Tatiana Guderzo
2013
 Russia Time Trial, Tatiana Antoshina
 Italy Time Trial, Tatiana Guderzo
 Italy Track (Omnium), Marta Tagliaferro
 Italy Track (Team Pursuit), Marta Tagliaferro  
 Italy Track (Team Pursuit), Tatiana Guderzo
2014
 Italy Track (Team Pursuit), Marta Tagliaferro 
 Italy Track (Team Pursuit), Tatiana Guderzo
2015
 Poland Road Race, Małgorzata Jasińska 
2016
 Italy Track (Points Race), Maria Giulia Confalonieri
2017
 Lithuania Road Race, Daiva Tušlaitė
2018
 Lithuania Time Trial, Daiva Tušlaitė
 European Road Race, Marta Bastianelli
2019
 Japan Time Trial, Eri Yonamine
 Japan Road Race, Eri Yonamine
2020
 Slovenia Road Race, Urša Pintar
 Slovenia Time Trial, Urška Žigart
 Spain Time Trial, Mavi García
 Spain Road Race, Mavi García
 Thailand Road Race, Jutatip Maneephan
2021
 Swiss Time Trial, Marlen Reusser
 Swiss Road Race, Marlen Reusser
 Slovenia Time Trial, Eugenia Bujak
 Slovenia Road Race, Eugenia Bujak
 Spain Time Trial, Mavi Garcia
 Spain Road Race, Mavi García
2022
 UAE Time Trial, Safia Al Sayegh
 UAE Road Race, Safia Al Sayegh
 Spain Time Trial, Mavi García
 Spain Road Race, Mavi García
2023
 UAE Time Trial, Safia Al Sayegh

References

External links

Cycling teams based in Italy
UCI Women's Teams
Cycling teams established in 2011
Ale Cipollini